USS Barry (DDG-52) is an  guided missile destroyer, commissioned in 1992. Barry is the fourth United States Navy ship named after the "Father of the American Navy", Commodore John Barry (1745–1803). Her homeport is Naval Station Everett, Washington. Several improvements over  exist on this ship and all following Arleigh Burke-class destroyers, such as the ability to refuel a helicopter.

Barrys keel was laid down on 26 February 1990, at the Ingalls Shipbuilding shipyard in Pascagoula, Mississippi. She was launched on 10 May 1991, and christened on 8 June 1991, by her sponsor Rose Cochran, wife of United States Senator Thad Cochran. Barry was commissioned into the U.S. Atlantic Fleet on 12 December 1992, and was placed under the command of Commander Gary Roughead. The commissioning ceremony took place at Naval Station Pascagoula in Pascagoula, Mississippi.

Following ship's commissioning, Barry underwent Post Delivery Test and Trials (PDT&T). During this period, Barry tested every major system on board. An Operational Propulsion Plant Examination (OPPE) was conducted, with Barry receiving an overall grade of Excellent. Combat Systems Ship Qualifications Trials (CSSQT) were also conducted that included 13 missile firings.

Barry has received many awards, including the Battenberg Cup for the years 1994, 1996, and 1998—making Barry one of only three ships (as of 2008) to have won the prestigious award three times. She has also been awarded the Battle E award 7 times, and received the Golden Anchor and Silver Anchor Awards for retention. More recently, in 2004 Barry received the Arleigh Burke Fleet Trophy for being the most improved ship in the Atlantic Fleet.

History

1993
In April 1993, Barry underwent Final Contract Trials (FCT) before returning to Ingalls Shipbuilding in May 1993, for a three-month Post Shakedown Availability (PSA). This availability included a 4-week dry-docking that included installation of the Navy's new generation Advanced Technology Design propellers, designed to reduce cavitation at high speed and improve fuel economy. Other improvements included installation of an Electro-Optical Sighting System (EOSS), application of Passive Countermeasure System (PCMS) material, tank stiffening and installation of a gray water collection system. On 21 October 1993, Captain Gary Roughead, Barrys first commanding officer, was relieved by Commander James G. Stavridis. Barry was under command of (tactical) Destroyer Squadron 26 in 1993, 1994 and 1995, while administratively part of Destroyer Squadron 2. In November 1993, Barry received orders to proceed to Haiti, to take part in Operation Support Democracy. Barrys duties included enforcing the embargo of arms and petroleum products to the island nation.

1994 
In January 1994, Barry completed her first combined Combat Systems Assessment (CSA)/Cruise Missile Tactical Qualification (CMTQ), achieving one of the Atlantic Fleet's highest score to date. In March, Barry participated in exercise MAYFLYEX 94 where her Aegis combat system successfully engaged and destroyed several Exocet anti-ship cruise missiles. In April, Barry wrapped up her preparations for her first overseas combat deployment by participating in FLEETEX 2–94 with other units of the  Battle Group. A highlight of this exercise was a covert SEAL team extraction in shallow water only a few miles off the Carolina coast, successfully validating the stealth characteristics of the DDG-51 class.

On 20 May 1994, Barry departed Norfolk, Virginia, on her first Mediterranean deployment. During Barrys maiden deployment, she served alongside the aircraft carrier George Washington as the backdrop for the 50th anniversary of D-Day. Barry also sailed the Mediterranean and Adriatic Seas as "Red Crown" in support of the No-Fly Zone over Bosnia-Herzegovina.

On 7 October 1994, Barry received orders to proceed to the Persian Gulf' in response to Iraq's massing of troops on the Kuwaiti border. In what would become known as Operation Vigilant Warrior, Barrys participation included escort of both George Washington, and an amphibious assault group, to anchorage off Kuwait City. Barry also served as alternate Persian Gulf Anti-Air Warfare Coordinator (AAWC), and principal Tomahawk strike platform during the crisis. Barry received a Meritorious Unit Commendation, the Southwest Asia Service Medal, the Armed Forces Service Medal, and the NATO Medal for her actions during the deployment and returned home to Norfolk, Virginia on 17 November 1994.

1995 
In January 1995, Barry began a three-month SRA at Moon Engineering located in Portsmouth, Virginia. This SRA included the Women at Sea (WAS) modification.

2003 
In March 2003, she was assigned to Destroyer Squadron 26.

2004 
In 2004, Barry participated at the annual Fleet Week in New York City.

2006 

In 2006, Barry joined her sister ship, in providing cover for Orient Queen, a cruise ship chartered by the United States to help evacuate American citizens during the 2006 Israeli-Lebanon conflict.

2011 

On 1 March 2011, Barry was dispatched to the Mediterranean Sea, in response to the 2011 Libyan civil war. On 19 March 2011, the Navy reported that Barry fired 55 Tomahawk cruise missiles to suppress the Libyan air defense system in support of United Nations Security Council Resolution 1973.
The official codename for the U.S. part of the operation is Operation Odyssey Dawn. On 28 March, Barry assisted a U.S. Navy P-3C Orion, from Patrol Squadron Five, and an A-10 Thunderbolt aircraft attacking a group of three Libyan Coast Guard boats which were firing upon merchant vessels.

2013 

2016 
Lassen operated out of Yokosuka, from 2005 to 2016. Barry completed midlife modernization prior to making the switch and was outfitted with Aegis Baseline 9, the latest combat system, which is capable of defensive and offensive operations against aircraft, cruise missiles, ballistic missiles, surface ships, submarines and shore targets. Barry also received a fully integrated bridge, quality-of-life upgrades, and advanced galley during refit.

2020 

On 10 April and 24 April 2020, Barry transited the Taiwan Strait.

2022
Also deployed was sister ship  and cruiser .

2023
After forward deployment for nearly seven years, Barry moved to Everett, Washington where the ship will undergo routine maintenance.

Awards
 Navy Unit Commendation - (Jan 1994-Dec 1997, Oct 1997-Apr 1998, 5-31 Mar 2011)
 Navy Meritorious Unit Commendation - (2-8 Jun 1994, Jun-Nov 1994, Apr-Sep 2002, Jan 2011-Nov 2012, Feb-Nov 2020)
 Navy E Ribbon - (1994, 1996, 1997, 1998, 2011, 2013, 2020)
 Humanitarian Service Medal - (Jul-Aug 2006)
 Battenberg Cup - (1994, 1996, 1998)
Bloodhound award (2020-Pacific)
 Spokane Trophy - (2020)
 Arleigh Burke Fleet Trophy - (2004)

Gallery

References

External links

Official USS Barry Web site
 20 March 2007. Naval Vessel Register. NAVSEA Shipbuilding Support Office (NAVSHIPSO)

Further reading

 

Destroyers of the United States
Arleigh Burke-class destroyers
Ships built in Pascagoula, Mississippi
1991 ships
Carrier Strike Group Two